Adam James Smith (born 29 April 1991) is an English professional footballer who plays as a right back for  club AFC Bournemouth. He has also represented England at under-21 level.

Club career

Tottenham Hotspur and loan moves
Smith is a product of the Tottenham Hotspur youth academy.

In August 2009, Smith joined Wycombe Wanderers on a short-term loan as cover for two injured right backs, making his Football League debut away against Charlton Athletic on 8 August 2009. After a short loan spell at Wycombe Wanderers, which ended on 5 September 2009, he was selected to represent the England Under 19s in the 2010 European qualifications in Slovenia. Smith made his England debut and played 90 minutes in the final group game against Slovakia, which England won 2–0.

In November 2009, Smith joined League Two outfit Torquay United on loan until January 2010.

On 23 September 2010, Smith joined AFC Bournemouth on a month loan deal. He started his spell against Carlisle United in a game in which he won a sixty-fourth-minute penalty, which new teammate Michael Symes scored. The game finished 2–0 to Bournemouth and left them third in the table.

Smith was then part of the Bournemouth side who lost 2–0 at Southampton. The youngster was sent off late on following two bookable offences. He missed the trip to Brighton & Hove Albion but returned for Bournemouth's 3–2 win against MK Dons, maintaining his 100% win ratio. This run was brought to an end when Smith played in a 2–1 defeat against Colchester United at Dean Court on 30 October 2010. On 1 April, Smith scored his first goal for Bournemouth an equaliser in the 94th minute against Peterborough United at London Road helping the cherries come back from 3–1 down with 20 minutes to go after Steve Fletcher's bullet header made the score 3–2.

In August 2011 it was announced that Smith had joined Milton Keynes Dons on a season-long loan deal. On 5 November, he got his first goal for the club against Rochdale scoring from distance. At the end of January 2012, Smith was recalled from his loan spell at Milton Keynes Dons.

He signed for Leeds United on 31 January 2012 for a season long loan. He proved to be manager Simon Grayson's last signing as Grayson was sacked the following day. Smith made his debut in Leeds 3–0 win against Bristol City on 4 February. In February Tottenham recalled Smith to provide First Team cover after first-choice right back Kyle Walker had picked up an injury. On 13 May 2012, Smith made his Premier League debut after replacing Younès Kaboul in the 76th minute of Tottenham's 2–0 win over Fulham.

On the first day of November after making just one appearance in the League Cup, Smith joined Millwall on a three-month loan deal. Following a successful stay with 18 appearances and a winning goal, Millwall announced on deadline day that they had extended the loan deal to the end of the season.

On the 29 July 2013, Smith joined Derby County on a season-long loan as a replacement for John Brayford who had left the club for Cardiff City. Smith made his debut in Derby's 1–0 first round League Cup win at Oldham Athletic on 6 August. He played again in a 5–0 second round League Cup win against Brentford on 27 August but he had to wait five matches for his league debut, which came as a half time substitute for fellow right-back Kieron Freeman in Derby's 3–0 loss at home to Burnley on 31 August. He started all of Derby's next seven league matches, though he was withdrawn after 61 minutes in the first, a 5–1 victory at Millwall, out of concerns for his safety. Millwall were 3–0 down and playing with 10 men and Smith was struck by bottles and coins thrown by the home fans so he was replaced by Freeman. After losing his place in the team to Liverpool loanee Andre Wisdom, Smith's loan spell was terminated by mutual consent on 30 November 2013 and he returned to Tottenham.

AFC Bournemouth
On 28 January 2014, Smith re-joined Bournemouth this time on a permanent basis signing a three-and-a-half-year deal. On 19 December 2015, he scored for the club in a 2–1 away win against West Bromwich Albion.

International career
Smith has represented England at various youth team levels.

Career statistics

Honours
AFC Bournemouth
Championship: 2014–15; runner-up: 2021–22

References

External links

AFC Bournemouth profile

1991 births
Living people
English footballers
England youth international footballers
England under-21 international footballers
Association football defenders
Tottenham Hotspur F.C. players
Wycombe Wanderers F.C. players
Torquay United F.C. players
AFC Bournemouth players
Milton Keynes Dons F.C. players
Leeds United F.C. players
Millwall F.C. players
Derby County F.C. players
Premier League players
English Football League players
Footballers from Leytonstone